Peb or PEB may refer to: personal examination bankrupt

Organisations
 École secondaire de Par-en-Bas, a Canadian French high school
 PEB Steel, Vietnamese
 Physical Evaluation Board of US Navy Department
 PLUS Expressways Berhad, Malaysia

Technology and engineering
 Process Environment Block in Windows NT family
 Pre-engineered building, in structural engineering

People
 Techmaster P.E.B., American Miami bass DJ
 Pierre Bellocq (born 1926), French-American artist and cartoonist known as "Peb"
 Pierre-Édouard Bellemare, professional ice hockey player for the Tampa Bay Lightning of the National Hockey League
 p e b, ( Born 1994 ) Music Producer, Artist

Other uses
 Eastern Pomo language (ISO 639-3 code)
 Pevensey Bay railway station, a railway station in Sussex, England